The 1873 Eton football team represented Eton College in the 1873 college football season. The college, based near Windsor, England, played one game, losing 1–2 against Yale.

Schedule

References

Eton
College football winless seasons